Şərədil (also, Sharadil’ and Sheradil’) is a village and municipality in the Shamakhi Rayon of Azerbaijan.  It has a population of 581.

References 

Populated places in Shamakhi District